USS Ponce may refer to more than one United States Navy ship:

 , was an 18-ton motorboat in the service of the United States Navy during World War I
 , was an amphibious transport commissioned in 1971 and decommissioned in 2017

United States Navy ship names